Indian Neck Hall was a country residence of Frederick Gilbert Bourne, president of the Singer Sewing Machine Company. Located on the Great South Bay in Oakdale, New York, it was reputed to have been the largest estate on Long Island when it was built in 1897.

The Georgian-style home was designed by a noted architect, Ernest Flagg. In 1926, the property was sold and became La Salle Military Academy. St. John's University acquired the property in 2001 and offers a number of its graduate degree programs from the Oakdale campus.

See also
List of Gilded Age mansions

References

Malo, Paul.  Fools' Paradise: Remembering the Thousand Islands (Fulton, NY: Laurentian Press, 2003)

Islip (town), New York
Houses in Suffolk County, New York
Houses completed in 1897
1897 establishments in New York (state)
Georgian architecture in New York (state)
Gilded Age mansions